Jama Masjid or Jama Mosque is a 17th-century mosque in Dildarnagar, Uttar Pradesh, India. It is the oldest mosque in Dildarnagar.

Transport links
 It is 0.5 kilometers from the railway junction at Dildarnagar.

References

Dildarnagar
Mosques completed in 1990
Mosques in Uttar Pradesh
Dildar Nagar